So Long may refer to:
 So Long, a song by Lake Street Dive
 So Long, a 2007 album by Stereoside
 "So Long" (Russ Morgan song), 1940, recorded by numerous artists including The Charioteers and Ruth Brown
 "So Long" (ABBA song), 1974
 "So Long" (Firefall song), from Luna Sea, 1977
 "So Long" (Everlast song), 1999
 "So Long!" (AKB48 song), 2013
 "So Long" (Diplo song), 2019
 "So Long", a song by Fats Domino which reached No. 44 on U.S. Billboard Hot 100 chart and No. 5 on the U.S. Billboard R&B charts in 1956.
 "So Long", a song by The Kinks from Kinda Kinks
 "So Long", a song by Fischer-Z from Going Deaf for a Living
 "So Long", a song by Guster from Lost and Gone Forever
 "So Long", a song by Krokus from Hellraiser
 "So Long", a 2017 song by Massari
 "So Long", a song by MC Hammer from Look Look Look
 "So Long", a song by Rilo Kiley from The Execution of All Things
 "So Long", a song by Seba & Lo-Tek
 “So Long”, a song by Slander
 "So Long, It's Been Good to Know Yuh", a 1935 song by Woody Guthrie
 "So Long", a song by Off Broadway from Quick Turns, 1980